The Helen Lempriere National Sculpture Award at Werribee Park was Australia's most financially rewarding prize for sculpture, instituted in 2000, and providing a total of A$145,000 in prizes to award recipients each year. The last award was made in 2008. In 2009, the trustees of the Helen Lempriere Bequest announced that the Helen Lempriere National Sculpture Award would not be made, and the award is now defunct.

Withholding of the award in 2009 
In 2009, the award was withheld when a new selection process for finalists (a change from application to invitation) resulted in what The Age newspaper called 'a disaster', when an insufficient number of entries of good standard led to the withholding of the exhibition and award for that year. The trustees of the Helen Lempriere Bequest, Perpetual Private Wealth, announced in December 2009 that the award would no longer be made. Rather than being organised under its own auspices at Werribee Park, the award would instead be absorbed into the Sydney-based Sculpture by the Sea award.

The 2010 scholarships 
On 23 December 2009, David Knowles of Perpetual Private Wealth announced that the new manager of the Lempriere award would be the Sculpture by the Sea organisation, and that in 2010, the award would comprise three A$30,000 scholarships for sculptors.

Exhibition 
Until the award's restructuring in 2009, an exhibition of the finalists was held each year in the grounds of Werribee Park, Werribee, Victoria, Australia. The award was acquisitive, and winners were brought into the collection displayed along the Sculpture Walk at Werribee Park. The local government authority, Wyndham City Council, would also purchase works for deployment as sculptural installations in the municipality. The future of the collection at Werribee Park remains unresolved; Perpetual Private Wealth has announced a separate review.

Complete list of winners 
2016
Jennifer Turpin (NSW), operation crayweed
Geoffrey Bartlett (VIC), embrace
Hanna Hoyne (ACT), cosmic trumpet & embrace 2
Norton Flavell (WA), just another

2015
Orest Keywan (NSW), and the ship sails on (with apologies to f.f.)
Dale Miles (NSW), parallel thinking space
Samantha Small (ACT), stalemate Mk II

 2014
Elaine Clocherty, gamma gamma – storm
Jock Clutterbuck, oceania cartouche
Koichi Ishino, wind stone – the threshold of consciousness

 2013
Lucy Humphrey, horizon
Francesca Matagara, a to b
Paul Selwood, the museum

2012
Lou Lambert, red herring
Philip Spelman, tête à tête
Tom de Munk-Kermeer, luchtkasteel
 
2011
Alessandra Rossi, comfort zone
James Rogers, hokusai’s child
Marcus Tatton, the ruin

 2010
David Horton, jarrett in london
Matthew Harding, centripetal
Michael Le Grand, anaconda

2001 (Inaugural prize) - Karen Ward, Hut
2002 - Nigel Helyer, Meta Diva
2003 - Gary Wilson, Untitled
2004 - Richard Goodwin, Prosthetic Apartment B
2005 - William Eicholtz, The Comrade's Reward
2006 - Alexander Knox, Death of a White Good
2007 - Julia Davis, Meniscii
2008 - Bob Jenyns, Pont de l'archeveche
2009 - Award withheld

References

External links
Helen Lempriere National Sculpture Award website

Australian art awards
Sculpture awards
2000 establishments in Australia
Awards disestablished in 2009
American sculpture awards